Norbert Wagner (born 12 February 1929) is a German philologist who specializes in Germanic studies.

Biography
Norbert Wagner was born in Straubing, Germany on 12 February 1929. After gaining his abitur in 1947, Wagner studied German philology under Ernst Schwarz, and also history and English, at the University of Regensburg. Wagner transferred to the Ludwig Maximilian University of Munich in 1948, where he studied under Otto Basler and other scholars. Wagner received his Ph.D. in 1955 at the University of Würzburg under the supervision of Franz Rolf Schröder. His thesis was on the Völsunga saga. 

After gaining his Ph.D., Wagner took courses in Indo-European studies and Indology under Manfred Mayrhofer, and worked as a research assistant in the Department for Ancient Germanic Studies. His thesis on Getica and the early history of the Goths was published in 1967. Wagner subsequently served as Professor at the Institute for German Philology at the University of Würzburg. He retired from his duties in 1997, but has continued to teach and research. Wagner specializes in Germanic philology and Germanic Antiquity, particularly onomastics and Gothic language, literature and history.

See also
 Heinrich Beck
 Rudolf Simek
 Robert Nedoma
 Klaus Böldl

Selected works
 Studien zu den ersten Kapiteln der Volsunga saga (Kapitel 2-8, 10-12), Universität Würzburg 1955.
 Getica. Untersuchungen zum Leben des Jordanes und zur frühen Geschichte der Goten, de Gruyter, Berlin 1967.
 Zahlreiche Beiträge in Fachperiodika, besonders in: Beiträge zur Namenforschung und Historische Sprachforschung.

Sources
 Kürschners Gelehrten-Kalender 2009. K. G. Saur Verlag, München 2009

1929 births
German male non-fiction writers
German philologists
Germanic studies scholars
Linguists of Gothic
Living people
Old Norse studies scholars
University of Würzburg alumni
Academic staff of the University of Würzburg
Writers on Germanic paganism